Pristimantis orcesi is a species of frog in the family Strabomantidae. It is endemic to the Andes of central and northern Ecuador. The specific name orcesi honors , an Ecuadorian naturalist. Common names Orces robber frog and Bolivar robber frog have been proposed for this species.

Description
Adult males measure  and adult females  in snout–vent length. The snout is short and rounded. The tympanum is visible. The fingers and toes bear lateral fringes as well as discs at their tips. The dorsum is dark chocolate-brown or black with white warts. The venter is paler than the dorsum. The iris is deep chocolate-brown. Males have a vocal sac.

Habitat and conservation
Development is direct (i.e., there is no free-living larval stage). It is potentially threatened by feral cows and fire. It is known from the Llanganates and Sangay National Parks and its range overlaps with some other protected areas.

References

orcesi
Endemic fauna of Ecuador
Amphibians of Ecuador
Amphibians of the Andes
Amphibians described in 1972
Taxa named by John Douglas Lynch
Taxonomy articles created by Polbot